Dorothea Paas is a Canadian singer-songwriter from Toronto, Ontario, whose debut album Anything Can't Happen was a longlisted nominee for the 2021 Polaris Music Prize.

Paas has released a number of EPs since 2012. Although she has often resisted active self-promotion, she successfully built up a career as a backing vocalist for musicians such as Jennifer Castle and U.S. Girls. Anything Can't Happen, which features Paul Saulnier of PS I Love You on bass guitar, has been described by critics as "Joni Mitchell fronting Shellac at a coffee shop".

In addition to her solo career, she also performs as a sometime guest vocalist with Badge Époque Ensemble. She has also had occasional roles as a film actress, most notably in Kazik Radwanski's films How Heavy This Hammer and Anne at 13,000 Ft.

Discography
Same Sun (2012)
A Thirst (2013)
Strange Times/Just the Same/Drought (2013)
Calm Your Body Down (2015)
Prest (2016)
No Loose Ends (2016)
One for the Road (2018)
Anything Can't Happen (2021)

References

External links

21st-century Canadian women singers
21st-century Canadian actresses
Canadian women singer-songwriters
Canadian folk singer-songwriters
Canadian indie rock musicians
Actresses from Toronto
Musicians from Toronto
Living people
Year of birth missing (living people)